Mozart and Salieri can refer to:

 The historical relationship between two classical composers, Mozart and Salieri
 Mozart and Salieri (play), an 1832 play by Alexander Pushkin
 Mozart and Salieri (opera), an 1897 one-act opera by Nikolai Rimsky-Korsakov
 Mozart and Salieri (film), a 1962 Soviet television drama film

See also
 Amadeus, a play by Peter Shaffer (1979)
 Amadeus (film), a film by Miloš Forman (1984)